Hornbach may refer to:

 Hornbach, Germany, municipality in the Südwestpfalz district
 Hornbach (retailer), German DIY chain
 Hornbach, German name for the river Horn (Schwarzbach)